Nitrosomonas aestuarii is a gram-negative, aerobe, bacterium from the genus of Nitrosomonas which metabolize ammonia to nitrite for its source of energy.

References

Nitrosomonadaceae
Bacteria described in 2001